Twin Township is one of the sixteen townships of Ross County, Ohio, United States.  The 2000 census found 3,146 people in the township.

Geography
Located in the south central part of the county, it borders the following townships:
Concord Township - north
Union Township - northeast, north of Scioto Township
Scioto Township - northeast, south of Union Township
Huntington Township - east
Pebble Township, Pike County - southeast
Benton Township, Pike County - south
Paxton Township - southwest
Paint Township - west
Buckskin Township - northwest

No municipalities are located in Twin Township, although the unincorporated community of Bourneville lies in the township's center.

Name and history
Statewide, other Twin Townships are located in Darke and Preble counties.

Government
The township is governed by a three-member board of trustees, who are elected in November of odd-numbered years to a four-year term beginning on the following January 1. Two are elected in the year after the presidential election and one is elected in the year before it. There is also an elected township fiscal officer, who serves a four-year term beginning on April 1 of the year after the election, which is held in November of the year before the presidential election. Vacancies in the fiscal officership or on the board of trustees are filled by the remaining trustees.

References

External links
County website

Townships in Ross County, Ohio
Townships in Ohio